Färjestad Bollklubb (abbreviated as FBK) is a Swedish professional ice hockey team based in Karlstad. Färjestad has had 21 Swedish Championship final appearances, winning ten times since the Swedish Hockey League (SHL; formerly Elitserien) was started in 1975, making them the most successful SHL club in history. The team plays in the highest Swedish league, and have done so since 1965. They and Brynäs IF are the only two teams to have constantly played in the current top tier of Swedish hockey, the SHL, since it was started in 1975. They reached the SHL championship finals six years in a row between 2001–2006, winning the championship two times. They are featured rivals with Djurgårdens IF, Frölunda HC, and HV71.

History
Färjestad BK was founded on 10 November 1932 at Håfström Kiosk in the district of Färjestad in Karlstad by Sven Bryhske, Gösta Jonsson, Sven Larsson and Erik Myren. Initially the association's main sport was bandy, which is still reflected in the full name of the club. Ice hockey was first included in 1956.

In 1965, Färjestad were promoted to the top division (at that time Division 1 Southern) which they succeeded in winning for the first time in 1973. During the 1974/75 season, Färjestad qualified for the first season of Elitserien, and have since never been relegated.

In 2014, Färjestad BK played in the 2014 AHL All Star Game in St. John's, Newfoundland against a team of AHL All Stars. In the skills contest, Färjestad lost 18-17 against the All Stars on a Tuesday evening at Mile One Center. In the AHL All-Star Game, Färjestad lost again to the AHL All Stars 7-2 with a sold out crowd the following evening.

Season-by-season results
This is a partial list of the five most recent seasons completed by Färjestad. For the full season-by-season history, see List of Färjestad BK seasons.

Players

Current roster

Updated 21 February, 2023

Team captains

Thomas Rundqvist 1987–1993
Håkan Loob, 1993–1996
Roger Johansson, 1996–1997 
Claes Eriksson, 1997–1998
Jörgen Jönsson, 1998–2007
Rickard Wallin, 2007–2009
Sanny Lindström, 2009–2010
Rickard Wallin, 2010–2013
Ole-Kristian Tollefsen 2013–2015
Magnus Nygren, 2015–2017
Alexander Johansson, 2017–2018
Mikael Wikstrand, 2018–2019
Linus Johansson, 2019–2020
Sebastian Erixon, 2020–2021
Linus Johansson, 2021–

Retired numbers

Franchise records and leaders

Regular season
Goals: 42 Håkan Loob (1982-83)
Assists: 36 Thomas Rhodin (2006-07)
Points: 76 Håkan Loob (1982-83)
Penalty Minutes: 213 Emil Kåberg (2004-05)
Career Goals: 262 Håkan Loob
Career Assists: 273 Jörgen Jönsson
Career Points: 500 Håkan Loob
Career Penalty Minutes: 546 Thomas Rhodin
Career Shutouts: 12 Daniel Henriksson
Career Games: 616 Mathias Johansson

Playoff season
Goals: 11 Rickard Wallin (2000-01)
Assists: 13 Jesper Mattsson (2005-06)
Points: 18 Marcel Jenni (2000-01), Jörgen Jönsson (2005-06)
Penalty Minutes: 84 Emil Kåberg (2004-05)
Career Goals: 43 Håkan Loob
Career Assists: 62 Jörgen Jönsson
Career Points: 102 Jörgen Jönsson
Career Penalty Minutes: 193 Peter Nordström
Career Shutouts: 5 Daniel Henriksson, Jonas Gustavsson (2008-09)
Career Games: 138 Peter Nordström

Total (Regular season + Playoffs)
Goals: 52  Håkan Loob (1982-83)
Assists: 41 Thomas Rhodin (2006-07)
Points: 90 Håkan Loob (1982-83)
Penalty Minutes: 297 Emil Kåberg (2004-05)
Career Goals: 305 Håkan Loob
Career Assists: 312 Thomas Rundqvist
Career Points: 566 Håkan Loob
Career Penalty Minutes: 703 Peter Nordström
Career Shutouts: 17 Daniel Henriksson
Career Games: 748 Mathias Johansson

Trophies and awards

Team
Swedish Championship regular season Swedish Hockey League (10): 1982, 1983, 1986, 1987, 1990, 1992, 2002, 2002, 2007, 2009, 2019
Le Mat Trophy (10): 1981, 1986, 1988, 1997, 1998, 2002, 2006, 2009, 2011, 2022
Spengler Cup (2): 1993, 1994; Runner Up 1989, 1992, 1997

See also
 List of Färjestad BK players selected in the NHL Entry Draft

References

External links

  

 
Swedish Hockey League teams
Ice hockey teams in Sweden
Sport in Karlstad
Defunct bandy clubs in Sweden
Bandy clubs established in 1932
Ice hockey clubs established in 1932
1932 establishments in Sweden
Ice hockey teams in Värmland County